The 2009-10 Qatari League or Qatari Stars League season will be the 37th edition of top-level football championship in Qatar and starts in September.

League expansion
The Qatar Stars League has slowly expanded since the turn of the decade, moving from 9 to 10 clubs and then latest setup of 12 clubs for the Qatari League 2009-10 campaign.

There are 2 divisions in the Qatari football structure and the league has previously seen one club promoted and relegated each year except in 'expansion' years.

It was announced on 15 April 2009 that no clubs would be relegated from the top flight in the Qatari League 2008-09 season, due to expansion reasons. The announcement was made with only one game remaining.

The expansion benefited relegated Al Kharatiyat, who will now stay in the first division, and will be joined by two second division clubs Al Ahli and Al Shamal, to bring the number up to 12.

Sheikh Hamad Bin Khalifah said the expansion would help in improving league action, which was also curtailed to two rounds instead of the prevailing system where the teams played each other three times.

Stadia and locations

Managerial changes

Final league table

 Al-Sailiya defeated Al-Mesaimeer 2-0 in the end of season relegation playoff to stay in the top flight

Fixtures and results

Top scorers
21 goals
  Younis Mahmoud (Al-Gharafa)
  Cabore (Al-Arabi)
20 goals
  Leandro (Al-Sadd)
17 goals
  Adil Ramzi (Al Wakra)
15 goals
  Clemerson (Al-Gharafa)
  Sebastian Soria (Qatar SC)
11 goals
  Magno Alves (Umm-Salal Sports Club)
10 goals
  Alaa Abdul-Zahra (Al-Kharitiyath Sports Club)
  Afonso Alves (Al-Sadd and Al-Rayyan)
9 goals
  Júlio César (Al-Ahli (Doha)'')

References

Qatar Stars League
Stars League